Ronan Carolan is a former Gaelic footballer who played for the Cavan county team.

Playing career
Carolan was a prolific freetaker for Cavan. He helped Cavan reach the All-Ireland Under 21 Football Championship final in 1988, but they were defeated by Offaly. In 1989, Cavan had a great run in the National Football League claiming the Div. 2 title and reaching the semi final, only to lose narrowly to Dublin in Croke Park. In the same year he won a Dr McKenna Cup medal when Cavan defeated Derry in the Final. He was a member of the Cavan squad that lost in the Ulster Final in 1996. But, in 1997, Carolan scored 10 points to help Cavan claim their only Ulster Senior Football Championship title in 28 years, beating Derry in Clones.

Carolan is 10th in the top all-time Ulster marksman, scoring 2–138 (144 pts).

Carolan is his county's top scorer in National Football League history, finishing his career with 19–387 (444) in that competition.

References

External links
 1997 Ulster Final

Year of birth missing (living people)
Living people
Ronan
Cavan inter-county Gaelic footballers
Irish physiotherapists